A Yorùbá name is a name that is part of a naming tradition that is primarily used by the Yoruba people and Yoruba language-speaking individuals in Benin, Togo, and Nigeria.

Naming ceremonies
Originally, male Yorùbá children were named on the ninth day after their birth, while the female child was named on the seventh day. However, nowadays, both genders are named on the seventh day. The names of the children are traditionally found by divination performed by a group of Babalawo - traditional Ifá priests, but in recent times names can also come from those of ranking members of the family, including the father, mother, grandparents, or next of kin. Both the mother and father and other elderly relatives can give their own favorite names to the child or children. That is why the Yorùbás usually have a long list of names. Baby names often come from the grandparents and great grandparents of the child to be named. The name traditionally divined by the Babaláwo indicates the Òrìṣà that guides the child and whether the child is a reincarnated ancestor and the destiny of the child and the spiritual entities that will assist the child in achieving it. There is first a private ceremony for just the parents where the names are given along with taboos for the child and parents and suggestions on what the child will need to be successful. Some days after that a public ceremony with feasting and entertainment is held and family and friends are all invited to celebrate the arrival of the child.

Composition and Importance of Names
Yorùbá names are often carefully considered during the week prior to the naming ceremony, as great care is placed upon selecting a name that would not reflect any sort of negativity or disrepute. In other words, selecting a name that previously belonged to a thief or criminal for a Yorùbá child is not considered as a wise idea, as it (according to Yorùbá philosophy) could result in the child growing up to become a thief or criminal. The Yorùbá believe that previous bearers of a name have an impact on the influence of the name in a child's life. 

Yorùbá names are traditionally classified into five categories:

 Orúko Àmútọ̀runwá 'Destiny Names', ("names assumed to be brought from heaven" or derived from a religious background). Examples are: Àìná, Ìgè, Òjó, Yétúndé, Abọ́sẹ̀dé, Táíwò, Kẹ́hìndé, Ìdòwú, Àlàbá, Bàbátúndé, Àjàyí, Abíọ́nà, Dàda, Ìdògbé, Yéwándé, Olúgbódi, et cetera. 

 Orúkọ Àbísọ 'Acquired Names', (literally "given on earth" or granted by next of kin). These include: Ọmọ́táyọ̀, Ìbílọlá, Adéyínká, Ọláwùnmí, Ọládọ̀tun, Ìbídàpọ̀, Ọlárìndé, Adérónkẹ́, Ajíbọ́lá, Ìbíyẹmí, Morẹ́nikẹ́, Mojísọ́lá, Fọláwiyọ́, Ayọ̀ọ́délé, Àríyọ̀, Oyèlẹ́yẹ, Ọmọ́tọ́lá, Ọmọlará, Fadérẹra, and hundreds of others. 
 Orúkọ Oríkì 'Panegyrical'. These names include: Àyìnlá, Àlàó, Àjọkẹ́, Àbẹ̀bí, Ìshọ̀lá, Àlàkẹ́, Àyọ̀ká, Ìyàndá, Àlàmú, Àlàní, Àkànmú, Àkànní, Àgbékẹ́, Àníkẹ́, Àjìún, Àmọ̀kẹ́, Àlàbí, Àbẹ̀kẹ́, Àmọ̀pé, Àjílé, Àwẹ̀ró, Àdìó, Àdìgún, Àṣàbí, Àdùfẹ́, Àbẹ̀fẹ́, Àbẹ̀jẹ́ and so on.

 Orúkọ Àbíkú. An Àbíkú is a child who cycles repeatedly, and within a short time frame, between life and death, thereby causing grief to the parents. The Yorùbá have a corpus of especial names for the Àbíkú. Some of this are appealing, while some are derogatory. Examples include: Málọmọ́, Kòsọ́kọ́, Dúrósinmí, Ikúkọ̀yí, Bíòbákú, Kòkúmọ́, Ikúdáìísí, Olúwadáìísí, Ìgbẹ́kọ̀yí, Àńdùú, Àńwòó, Káṣìmáawòó, Dúrótìmí, Dúróoríkẹ̀ẹ́, Ọmọ́túndé, Dúrójayé, Ikúmápàyí, Kalẹ̀jayé, Kòsọ́kọ́, Ajá, and so on.
 Orukọ Ìnagijẹ 'epithetic names'. Examples include: Eyínfúnjowó, Ajíláràn-án, Ajíṣafẹ́, Ọ̀pẹ́lẹ́ńgẹ́, Aríkúyẹrí, Agbọ́tikúyọ̀, Awẹ́lẹ́wà, Ìbàdì-àrán, Jẹ́jẹ́, Báòkú, Àkẹ́jù, Amọ́lẹ́gbẹ́, Agùntáṣọọ́lò, etc. 

Two of the most common destiny names among the Yoruba are Táíwò (or Táyé) and Kẹ́hìndé, which are given primarily to twins.
It is believed that the first of the twins is Táíwò (or Táyé), "tọ́-ayé-wò" meaning, (One who tastes the world) whose intention in coming out first is to perceive whether or not the environment that they are about to enter is a good one for his or her superior to be in. When he or she is satisfied, he or she somehow informs the other twin, Kéhìndé (now anglicised to Kenny, "kẹ́hìn-dé" meaning the one who comes last) to come out. 

Another with a traditional religious example is Ifáṣolá- Ifá grants wealth. Likely given to a child that is to be trained as a Babaláwo and it is predicted that the practice of Ifá will make the child wealthy and successful.

Modern Christian parents use the form of traditional names but substitute the  Òrìṣà name with Olú or Olúwa, meaning Lord or My Lord, which indicates the Christian concept of God and Jesus Christ. For example: Olúwatiṣé - (The Lord has done it) - the parents prayed for a child and were granted one by God, often replaces the more traditional Ifátiṣe, which recognizes the Divination system/Òrìṣà Ifá.

Muslim parents tend to give their children Islamic names. These names converted to fit into Yorùbá phonetics during pronunciation. Rofiah becomes Ràfíátù, Is'haq becomes Ísíákà, Usman becomes Sùnmọ́nù, Idris becomes Dìísù, Khadijah becomes Àdíjá, Aisha becomes Aishat, Ismail becomes Súnmẹ́là, Qudrah becomes Kúdírá or Kúdí, Imran becomes Múráínà, Dhikrullah becomes Síkírù, and so on. 

An acquired name may signify the position of the family in the society (e.g. "Adéwale", a typical royal family name). It may also signify the traditional vocation of the family (e.g. "Àgbẹ̀dẹ", the blacksmith or the prefix "Ògún," the patron god of blacksmiths and hunters).

Yoruba also have Oriki, a kind of praise recital used to emphasize the achievements of the ancestors of the various families. Oriki could be a single word name like "Àdùnní", or it could be verses recounting the ancestry of the person and their feats. Though not typically part of a standard name, the Oríkì is often used alongside one and is usually generally known to a person's acquaintances. Many individuals can even be recognized by the people of another town or even clan by using the oríkì of his or her ancestral line.

Choosing a name in modern times is often a difficult task because there is no complete list of Yoruba names. However, a new online project by a Nigerian linguist has been initiated to document all Yoruba names in multimedia format.

Popular Yoruba given names
In Yorubaland, there are a series of names which are popularly given to babies during naming ceremonies by their parents. These are the most common names for Yoruba people. A number of them are listed below.

See also

 Most Popular Yoruba Names
 Yoruba Name Documentation Project

References

 Akoto Yoruba Ode – Oni (Modern Yoruba Orthography) By Olufemi Abati. 2000. Unique Publishers ltd. Ibadan Nigeria. .

External links 
 YorubaName.com: A Multimedia Dictionary of Yorùbá Names 
 Yoruba
 Yoruba For Kids Abroad - Interactive for Yoruba Language Software for Yoruba Children                                                                                                 
 http://www.behindthename.com/names/usage/yoruba
 http://www.edeyoruba.com/
 http://www.babynamescube.com/yoruba-baby-names
 http://ngr.ng/yoruba-names-yoruba-children-names
 https://web.archive.org/web/20150914110614/http://www.nigeriasite.com:80/yoruba.html

Name
Name
 
Names by culture